The 2013 Bolivarian Games (Spanish: Juegos Bolivarianos), officially the XVII Bolivarian Games, was a major international multi-sport event that was held from November 16–30, 2013, in Trujillo, Peru, with some events held in Lima and Chiclayo. Approximately 4,500 athletes from 11 nations participated in 44 sports. These Games was the third Bolivarian Games that was hosted by Peru. Previously, Peru hosted the 1947–48 Bolivarian Games and the 1997 Bolivarian Games. Since 2011, Trujillo was preparing the sport buildings for the Bolivarian Games.

The 2013 Bolivarian Games was the first one to have athletes from 11 countries, instead of the usual 6 members of the Bolivarian Sports Organization (ODEBO).

Host city election

The Bolivarian Sports Organization (ODEBO) selected initially Panama City as the host for the 17th Bolivarian Games on May 5, 2010. ODEBO selected the city, after both opposing bids from Venezuela and Ecuador were dismissed. Venezuela's bid fell through, due to not getting general support from then Venezuelan President Hugo Chávez. Ecuador's bid was just not handed in on time, in order to be an official one.

On October 20, 2010, ODEBO decided to withdraw Panama City as host,  .ODEBO explained that Panama's Olympic Committee has actually two committees with two co-presidents in conflict, Miguel Vanegas and Miguel Sánchiz, one recognized by Panama's Supreme Court of Justice and the other one recognized by IOC. Ricardo Martinelli, Panama's president, commented: "I'm going to kill both of them... I will publicly ask both of them to hand over their resignations for the good of this country and stop with their petty personal interests.

Early 2011, Trujillo began to bid, to replace Panama City, as host of the 2013 Bolivarian Games. ODEBO's Games commission traveled to the Peruvian city to make a visual inspection of its facilities. The review found that Trujillo is capable of hosting the Games and unofficially stated that the city will host the 2013 Bolivarian Games. The official announcement was given on February 7, 2012, in Rio de Janeiro. Trujillo city will house about 4000 athletes from 11 countries in a modern sports complex.

Sport venues
Mansiche Sports Complex
Estadio Mansiche (Ceremonies venue, located in the Historic Centre of Trujillo city.)
Coliseo Gran Chimu
Sports Complex Chicago
Gildemeister Swimming Pool
Huanchaco Sports Center
La Esperanza Sports Center

Participating teams
All 6 nations of ODEBO competed in these Games. For the first time in Games' history, five non-ODEBO teams was given permission to participate as well. Number in parentheses represents number of athletes for each team.

  (355)
  (388)
  (514)
 ** (232)
  (578)
 ** (135)
 ** (380)
  (111)
 ** (103)
  (Host Nation) (795)
  (789)

Note: ** denotes non-ODEBO team.

Sports
For the 2013 Bolivarian Games, 561 events in 44 sports was contested here. These Games was the first time that rugby was played at the Bolivarian Games.
Numbers in parentheses indicate the number of medal events contested in each sport.

 Aquatics
 
 
 
 
 
 
 
 
 
 
 
 
 
 
   
 
 
   BMX racing (4)
   Mountain biking (3)
   Road racing (4)
   Track cycling (18)
 
 
 
 
 
 
 Gymnastics
 
 
 
 
 
 
 
 
 
 
 
 
 
 
 
 
 
 
 
 Finswimming (8)
 Free-diving (2)
 Spearfishing (2),
 Volleyball

Calendar

Medal table
Key:
 
Final medal tally.

See also
 Pan American Games
 Central American and Caribbean Games
 Central American Games
 South American Games

References

External links
 Official website

 
Bolivarian Games
Bolivarian
Bolivarian Games
Bolivarian
Bolivarian
Sports in Trujillo, Peru
Multi-sport events in Peru
November 2013 sports events in South America